Alasdair Drysdale (born 1950) is professor emeritus of geography and formerly associate dean of the College of Liberal Arts at the University of New Hampshire.

Education
Drysdale was educated at Strathallan School near Perth, Scotland. He studied at Durham University gaining a BA (Hons) in modern middle eastern studies (geography and Arabic) in 1971 and an MA in geography in 1972. In 1977 he was awarded a PhD in geography from the University of Michigan.

Research
Drysdale's expertise encompasses human geography, political geography, and population and development in the non-western world, specifically, Syria and the Middle East. His early research focused on Syria and its internal complexities as well as its external relationships with its neighbours in the Middle East and countries further afield.  More recently, his research has centred on the rapid ageing of the population in the Middle East, and responses to that growth in Oman and Jordan.

In 1990 he gave a prepared statement on Syria to the United States House Foreign Affairs Subcommittee on Europe and the Middle East regarding The Middle East in the 1990s.

Drysdale serves on the editorial board of The Northeastern Geographer (2007–) and the Arab World Geographer (1998–), for whom he was also the North American book review editor (1998–2007). He also served on the international advisory board of the journal Geopolitics (1996–2007).

Publications
Drysdale has authored books, book chapters and articles. He has provided country profiles for inclusion in various encyclopaedias, yearbooks and atlases.  Entries include: Syria and Libya in the Colliers Yearbook from 1980 to 1997, Compton's Encyclopedia, Cambridge Encyclopedia of the Middle East, Oxford Companion to Politics of the World, Funk & Wagnalls New Encyclopedia and Earth: The Comprehensive Atlas.

Books

Book chapters

References

External links
Alasdair Drysdale - Statement to United States House Foreign Affairs Subcommittee 17 July 1990

1950 births
Living people
People educated at Strathallan School
Alumni of St Cuthbert's Society, Durham
Horace H. Rackham School of Graduate Studies alumni
University of New Hampshire faculty
Scottish geographers
Scottish expatriates in the United States